Kysucké Nové Mesto ( / Oberneustadl) is a town in Žilina Region, Slovakia, near the city of Žilina.

History
The first signs of settlement

In 1976 lumps of burnt clay and ceramics were found under Stránsky vrch, which highlighted the settlement in this area. Archaeologists date the acquired material back to the La Tène Age. These findings are now stored in the Manor-house of Radoľa located near Kysucké Nové Mesto

Middle Ages

The first mention of the city

The town is mentioned for the first time in 1254 (under the name Jesesin, in the Bela's IV donation treaty). In 1321 lachasin is mentioned as a place where toll is collected. The privileges of a town with a market law were given the city (under the name Congesberg) in 1325. In 1358 the name of Nova Civitas (Nové Mesto - New Town) is already used.  The inhabitants were mainly engaged in agriculture, sheep breeding, trade and handcraft.

Modern Period

The town in the 19th century was falling due to the floods (in 1813, 1821), the fires (1823, 1904), but also due to the large expatriation in the whole region. After the fire in August 1904, only 30 homes remained in the city. The economic development of the city took place after the Second World War.

The Kysucké Nové Mesto developed mainly the engineering industry.

The relationship with Austro-Hungary was expressed by inhabitants during the WWI in the Riot in Kragujevac (June 2, 1918).

In World War II people fought with German occupation forces not only in Slovakia in the Slovak national uprising, but also in European struggles, contributing to the defeat of fascism.

Contemporary period

Kysucké Nové Mesto has been making its present form for centuries. The biggest and fastest changes occurred after World War II.

The importance of the town increased after the year 1950, when the Závody presného strojárstva (later ZVL) were created. The company provided work to thousands of people and started significant changes in the town.

New housing estates, schools, offices, shops, sports facilities were created. Kysucké Nové Mesto has a built infrastructure that is currently being improved to meet the needs of its residents and visitors.

Names

 150 - Asanka - according to the Greek geographer Ptolemy- settlement lying on the amber road
 1254 - Jesesin 
 1300 - Yesesin
 1338 - Jachatin - Chateau of the count Mikuláš Zeech - regional judge, but also the name Lethesin appears in the documents. The part of the word 'Jacha' probably represents name Jakub(James the Less - the patron of the town) and 'Tin' means the castle (the Castle of James).
 1325 - following names:
 Congesbergh
 Kongesberg
 Königsberg - the Královský vrch (now the Tábor hill), under which the river Kysuca flows. The name of Königsberg was not used, still  it was called with the Slavic name Jačatín, because most of its inhabitants formed Slavic ethnicity.
 1358 - Civitas Nova - Castrum Novum - New Town during Ľudovít Veľký
 1438 - Nowe Mesto - name Jačatín (Jachatin) did not disappear
 1507 - Kisucza UJhely (Ujvar)
 1784 - Horní Nové Mesto 
 1873 - Nové Mesto nad Kysucou 
 1907 - Kisuca Ujhely - at the time of Magyarization
 1920 - Kysucké Nové Mesto

Geography

Demographics
According to the 2001 census, the town had 16,558 inhabitants. 95.13% of inhabitants were Slovaks, 1.02% Czechs and 0.79% Roma and Germans. The religious make-up was 86.20% Roman Catholics, 6.79% people with no religious affiliation and 0.47% Lutherans.

Twin towns — sister cities

Kysucké Nové Mesto is twinned with:
 Gogolin, Poland 
 Jablunkov, Czech Republic
 Łodygowice, Poland
 Rive-de-Gier, France

References

External links
 Official website 

Cities and towns in Slovakia